Pete DePaolo (April 6, 1898 – November 26, 1980) was an American race car driver who won the 1925 Indianapolis 500.

Biography
Peter DePaolo was born on April 6, 1898, in Philadelphia, Pennsylvania. Pete saw his first race in 1919, where he watched his uncle Ralph DePalma win from Pete's perch his riding mechanic. He drove in the 1922 Indianapolis 500, finishing 4th. DePaolo had his worst career injury at the Kansas City board track; his car rolled four times. He spent three weeks in the hospital with a severely cut up face and two lost teeth. Both men had been thrown from car and his riding mechanic Harry "Cotton" Henning pulled DePaolo from the car. Henning spent several months in the hospital with a broken ankle and broken ribs. 

At the 1925 Indianapolis 500, DePaolo pulled out to a huge lead. DePaolo's strategy in the race was to run the left side tires in the oil slick on the middle the track for two laps then runs his right side tires in the oil slick for two laps. His fingers became badly blistered around the midpoint of the race, and car owner Fred Duesenberg pulled DePaolo out of the car in favor of Norm Batten. DePaolo had his hands repaired in the infield care center, and returned in the car after missing 21 laps. Although his car had dropped to fifth position, DePaolo won that race and was on his way to the series' driver's championship. It was the first Indianapolis 500 to average over 100 miles per hour (101.270 mph), and  DePaolo became the first driver to average more than 100 mph at the Indianapolis 500, recording 101.13 in his Duesenberg. Nevertheless, DePaolo did not consider it his greatest win because he'd been relieved for 21 laps.

He founded his own team in 1927 and finished second in the 1927 Indianapolis 500, and added two wins on his way to the series' driver's championship.

In 1934, DePaolo drove the Harry Miller four-wheel-drive race car in races throughout Europe and Africa.  At the Avus course, near Berlin, while leading the race in a downpour, his engine threw two connecting rods which narrowly missed hitting Adolf Hitler in his trackside box seat.

DePaolo decided to retire in 1934 after he was in a coma for 11 days after crashing in Spain. He sang "Back Home Again in Indiana" prior to the start of the Indianapolis 500 in 1971, the only driver to do so as of 2019. DePaolo served as the Grand Marshall of the BiCentennial Parade in Roseland in 1976. DePaolo Court in Roseland is named after him.

He died on November 26, 1980, at age 82.

Indianapolis 500 results

Car owner
He was car owner and team manager for Kelly Petillo's 1935 Indianapolis 500 victory.

He was a successful NASCAR team owner from 1955 to 1957. His drivers finished second, third, and second in the final points standings. The drivers accumulated 21 wins and 109 Top 10 finishes in 178 starts. The team later became Holman Moody.

Awards
He was inducted in the Motorsports Hall of Fame of America in 1995.
He was inducted in the National Sprint Car Hall of Fame in 1995.

Writer
He wrote his biography in the book Wall Smacker, published in 1935. In the book he wrote that racing on a board track was "a great sensation, tearing around a board speedway dodging holes and flying timber."
DePaolo was an Associate Editor at Speed Age magazine when he wrote an eight-part series "I Drove The Boards" from July 1951 through August 1952.

References

External links

Biography

Miscellaneous race highlights
Motorsports Hall of Fame of America

1898 births
1980 deaths
Champ Car champions
Indianapolis 500 drivers
Indianapolis 500 winners
NASCAR team owners
National Sprint Car Hall of Fame inductees
Racing drivers from Philadelphia
AAA Championship Car drivers
American people of Italian descent
IndyCar Series team owners
Racing drivers from New Jersey
People of Apulian descent